Tursun Beg (probably born in mid-1420s in Bursa) was an Ottoman bureaucrat and historian who wrote a chronicle dedicated to Mehmed II.

Tursun Beg's life is only known from references in his chronicle.  He came from a prominent timariot family and held a timar himself. He worked in the imperial divan and accompanied Mehmed II during the siege of Constantinople in 1453 that led to the fall of Constantinople.

Tursun Beg's only known work is the Tarih-i Ebülfeth (تاريخ ابو الفتح in Ottoman; "The History of the Conqueror").

Bibliography
Tursun Beg.  The history of Mehmed the Conqueror.  [Tarih-i Ebülfeth] Halil Inalcik and Rhoads Murphey trans.  Minneapolis: Bibliotheca Islamica, 1978.
Woodhead, Christine.  "Tursun Beg."  Encyclopaedia of Islam.  2nd Edition.

See also
List of Muslim historians

References

15th-century historians from the Ottoman Empire